A story arc (also narrative arc) is the chronological construction of plot in a novel or story. It can also mean an extended or continuing storyline in episodic storytelling media such as television, comic books, comic strips, board games, video games, and films with each episode following a dramatic arc. On a television program, for example, the story would unfold over many episodes. In television, the use of the story arc is common in sitcoms, and even more so in soap operas. In a traditional Hollywood film, the story arc usually follows a three-act structure. Webcomics are more likely to use story arcs than newspaper comics, as most web comics have readable archives online that a newcomer to the strip can read in order to understand what is going on. Although story arcs have existed for decades, the term "story arc" was coined in 1988 in relation to the television series Wiseguy, and was quickly adapted for other uses.

Many American comic book series are now written in four- or six-issue arcs, within a continuing series. Short story arcs are easier to package as trade paperbacks for resale, and more accessible to the casual reader than the never-ending continuity that once characterized US comics.
A corollary to the absence of continuity, however, is that, as exemplified in 1950s DC Superman comics, no permanent change to characters or situations occurs, meaning no growth can take place. Thus, story lines repeat over time in a loop.

Dramatic structure and purpose
The purpose of a story arc is to move a character or a situation from one state to another, in other words, to effect change. This change or transformation often takes the form of either a tragic fall from grace or a reversal of that pattern. One common form in which this reversal is found is a character going from a situation of weakness to one of strength. For example, a poor woman goes on adventures and in the end makes a fortune for herself, or a lonely man falls in love and marries.

Another form of storytelling that offers a change or transformation of character is that of the "hero's journey," as laid out in Joseph Campbell's theory of the monomyth in his work, The Hero with a Thousand Faces. Christopher Vogler's The Writer's Journey: Mythic Structure for Writers details the same theory specifically for western storytelling.

Many renowned novelists and writers claim to use a story arc to create characters, stories, even curriculum. Several have published their use of the story arc to create memorable tomes in record time.

In television and radio

Story arcs on television and radio, and are common in many countries where multi-episode story lines are the norm. Examples are the UK's Doctor Who and most anime series.

Many arc-based series in past decades, such as V, were often short-lived and found it difficult to attract new viewers; they also rarely appear in traditional syndication. However, the rise of DVD box sets of complete seasons, as well as streaming, has worked in arc-based productions' favor as the standard season collection format allows the viewer to have easy access to the relevant episodes. One area of television where story arcs have always thrived, however, is in the realm of the soap opera, and often episodic series have been derisively referred to as "soap operas" when they have adopted story arcs.

Arc-based series draw and reward dedicated viewers, and fans of a particular show follow and discuss different story arcs independently from particular episodes. Story arcs are sometimes split into subarcs, if deemed significant by fans, making it easy to refer to certain episodes if their production order titles are unknown. Episodes not relevant to story arcs, such as "villain of the week" episodes) are sometimes dismissed as filler by fans, but might be referred to as self-contained or stand-alone episodes by producers.

Usage in manga and anime
Manga and anime are usually good examples of arc-based stories, to the point that most series shorter than twenty-six chapters are a single arc spanning all the chapters. This makes syndication difficult, as episodes watched in isolation often confuse viewers unless watched in conjunction with the series as a whole. Series of thirty chapters or longer usually have multiple arcs.

Neon Genesis Evangelion, for example, is a single story arc spanning twenty-six episodes. Other longer anime have multiple story arcs, such as Bleach, Gin Tama, One Piece, Naruto, Yu-Gi-Oh! and Fairy Tail. The anime Dragon Ball Z adapts four different story arcs from the Dragon Ball manga, each with its own ultimate antagonist, along with original story arcs created for the TV series.

See also
 Character arc 
 Dramatic structure
 Frame story
 Limited series
 Miniseries 
 Saga
 Serial
 Sjuzhet
 Storytelling
 Storyteller

References

External links
Degann, Jonathan. "Game Theory 101 - Part I". The Games Journal.

Continuity (fiction)
Fiction
Narratology
Plot (narrative)
Television terminology
Screenwriting
1980s neologisms